is a Japanese gravure idol, actress, television personality, AV idol, and idol singer. Considered one of the most popular AV idols of her generation, Aoi has starred in over 700 adult films since the start of her career from 2010. Once a leading actress for the AV studio Alice Japan, Aoi now exclusively performs for S1 No. 1 Style. She was also a former member of the idol group Ebisu Muscats between 2015 and 2018.

Life and career

Early modelling and TV career 

Born in Osaka, Tsukasa Aoi debuted as a uniform gravure model in the October 2008 issue of the magazine Bejean. In June 2009 she was cast as a regular in the Sun Television variety show Gung Gung Bone!, which was cancelled shortly later.

The same year, she made regular appearances on San-TV talk show Onagokoro and featured the segment "Tsukasa Aoi's Aim for the Top" in the Television Osaka variety show Idol Sniper 2. In December 2009, she starred in Aoi Shōjo, her first gravure video, and a second gravure video was released in August 2010.

In March 2014, Aoi featured as a Sailor Moon AV model in the film "Naked Ambition 2"

In September 2014, she starred in the film A Record Of Sweet Murder.

On 26 September 2015, she was announced as a second generation member of the Ebisu Muscats. She graduated from the group on June, 2018.

AV career 

Since her debut in 2010, Aoi has starred in over 700 adult videos in Japan, making her one of the most famous AV actresses of all time.

In August 2010, Aoi appeared nude for the first time in a photo set published by the magazine Bejean; in September it was formally announced her debut into the adult industry. Her AV debut film, "Absolute Girl Aoi Tsukasa", was released on 8 October 2010. She became an exclusive actress for the noted AV studio Alice Japan between 2010 and 2015.

In February 2011, she appeared on the cover of the magazine Saizo, being the first active AV actress to be chosen as cover girl.

In February 2012, she won the FLASH Award at the Adult Broadcasting Awards. The same year, she debuted in a leading role in a mainstream film, starring in the Ken'ichi Fujiwara's prison drama Female Prisoner No. 701 – Sasori, a remake of Shunya Itō's Female Convict 701: Scorpion (1972).

In 2013, she guest starred an episode of the TVBS comedy series True Love 365, being the first adult actress to appear in a Taiwanese dorama.

In 2015 she transferred from Alice Japan to S1 No. 1 Style. Her last film with Alice Japan Final Continuous Climatic Cumming Tsukasa Aoi, directed by Yuji Sakamoto was released on May 22, 2015.

In 2016, she received the Special Presenter Award from DMM Adult Award.

In 2019 she was nominated for the Best Actress Award at the 2019 Fanza Adult Awards. In the same year, there were rumours that Aoi was romantically involved with Arashi's popular boyband singer, Matsumoto Jun.

References

External links 

 Official Profile - Eightman
 Official Profile - S1
 

1990 births
living people

actresses from Osaka
Japanese idols
Japanese gravure models
Japanese female adult models
Japanese television personalities
Japanese pornographic film actresses

Ebisu Muscats